The Minister of Agriculture, Fisheries and Food was a United Kingdom cabinet position, responsible for the Ministry of Agriculture, Fisheries and Food. The post was originally named President of the Board of Agriculture and was created in 1889. In 1903, an Act was passed to transfer to the new styled Board of Agriculture and Fisheries certain powers and duties relating to the fishing industry, and the post was renamed President of the Board of Agriculture and Fisheries.

In 1919, it was renamed Minister of Agriculture and Fisheries. In 1954, the separate position of Minister of Food was merged into the post and it was renamed Minister of Agriculture, Fisheries and Food.

On 8 June 2001, the Ministry merged with Secretary of State for the Environment into the office of Secretary of State for Environment, Food and Rural Affairs. However, the Ministry of Agriculture, Fisheries and Food was not formally abolished until The Ministry of Agriculture, Fisheries and Food (Dissolution) Order 2002 (S.I. 2002/794) came into force on 27 March 2002.

Until the Dissolution Order also made the necessary amendments to the law when it did come into force, many statutory functions were still vested in the holder of the office of Minister of Agriculture, Fisheries and Food, rather in the Secretary of State at large. For that reason, in a final twist, Margaret Beckett had to be appointed formally as the last Minister of Agriculture, Fisheries and Food as well as becoming the first Secretary of State for Environment, Food and Rural Affairs.

List of Agriculture Ministers and Board Presidents

Presidents of the Board of Agriculture (1889–1903) 

Post created by the Board of Agriculture Act 1889.

Presidents of the Board of Agriculture and Fisheries (1903–1919) 

Board of Agriculture superseded by the Board of Agriculture and Fisheries in 1903.

Ministers of Agriculture and Fisheries, (1919–1954)

Ministers of Agriculture, Fisheries and Food (1954–2001) 

From 2002 the Ministry of Agriculture, Fisheries and Food was dissolved and ministerial responsibility formerly transferred to the Secretary of State for Environment, Food and Rural Affairs.

Notes

Citations

Agricultural organisations based in the United Kingdom
Agriculture, Fisheries and Food
Defunct ministerial offices in the United Kingdom
 
1889 establishments in the United Kingdom
2002 disestablishments in the United Kingdom